The Kolb Kolbra and King Kolbra are a family of American tandem two seater, high wing, strut-braced, pusher configuration, conventional landing gear-equipped ultralight aircraft that are produced in kit form by New Kolb Aircraft of London, Kentucky and intended for amateur construction.

Design and development
The Kolbra was intended as a dual control, ultralight trainer and was created  by combining the front half of a Firefly fuselage with the  rear fuselage cage of the Slingshot. The King Kolbra has a wide fuselage front, similar to the Mark III whereas the Kolbra has a pointed nose.

The Kolbra's factory standard engine was the  Rotax 582 engine, placing it in the Ultralight Trainer category, but it could be equipped with the   Rotax 912UL or the  Jabiru 2200 in the Experimental - Amateur-built category. The King Kolbra's standard engine was the Jabiru 2200.

Both aircraft feature a forward fuselage of welded 4130 steel tubing, mated to an aluminum tailboom. The horizontal stabilizer, tail fin and wings are also constructed of riveted aluminum tubing and feature full-span flaperons. All flying surfaces are covered in doped aircraft fabric. The wings and horizontal tail are quick-folding for storage and ground transport. The landing gear is sprung tubing for the main gear, with a steerable sprung tailwheel.

Variants
Kolbra
Two seats in tandem configuration, high wing ultralight, powered by a  Rotax 582,  Jabiru 2200 or  Rotax 912UL engine. Aircraft has a highly pointed nose.
King Kolbra
Two seats in tandem configuration, high wing ultralight, powered by an  Jabiru 2200 engine. Aircraft has a broad nose.

Specifications (Kolbra)

See also

References

External links

Kolbra
2000s United States ultralight aircraft